A plantlet is a young or small plant, produced on the leaf margins or the aerial stems of another plant.

Many plants such as spider plants naturally create stolons with plantlets on the ends as a form of asexual reproduction. Vegetative propagules or clippings of mature plants may form plantlets.
An example is mother of thousands. Many plants reproduce by throwing out long shoots or runners that can grow into new plants. Mother of thousands appears to have lost the ability to reproduce sexually and make seeds, but transferred at least part of the embryo-making process to the leaves to make plantlets.

See also
 Apomixis
 Plant propagation
 Plant reproduction

References

Plants